Nijaz Duraković (1 January 1949 – 29 January 2012) was a Bosnian author, intellectual, professor and politician who served as the 9th and final president of the League of Communists of Bosnia and Herzegovina from 1989 to 1990. He is widely considered to have been one of the most influential modern authors on sociopolitical issues in the region of his generation.

Duraković served as the Bosniak member of the Presidency of Bosnia and Herzegovina alongside Alija Izetbegović from 1993 to 1996, most of it during the Bosnian War. He was the founder and first president of the Social Democratic Party. He also served as member of the national House of Representatives from 2002 until 2006.

Born in January 1949, Duraković died in January 2012 at the age of 63.

Political career
Duraković was born in Stolac, PR Bosnia and Herzegovina, FPR Yugoslavia on 1 January 1949 to Hakija and Ćamila. He completed his primary and secondary education there, and then his BA, MA, and Ph.D. degrees in sociology at the University of Sarajevo. He served as the last president of the League of Communists of Bosnia and Herzegovina from 29 June 1989 until December 1990, and as the first president of the Social Democratic Party from 27 December 1992 to 6 April 1997. 

On 20 October 1993, Duraković became a member of the Presidency of the Republic of Bosnia and Herzegovina during the Bosnian War, serving alongside Alija Izetbegović until 5 October 1996. At the 2002 general election, he was elected to the national House of Representatives, serving as its member until 6 November 2006

Publications
Beyond politics, Duraković was widely recognized as one of the country's most prolific authors. His body of work includes 16 books and more than 200 scientific journals and articles which he wrote during his tenure as Senior Professor at the Faculty of Political Science in Sarajevo. Duraković's most prominent book is The Curse of Muslims (Prokletstvo Muslimana).

Death
Duraković died on 29 January 2012 in Sarajevo following a heart attack, at the age of 63.

His death was met with statements of sympathy and tribute from many people and organizations. Bosnian Presidency chairman Željko Komšić released a statement upon Duraković's death, describing him as a "great man" and a "successful politician and fighter for Bosnia and Herzegovina." Federal prime minister Nermin Nikšić stated "There will be a gap behind Duraković that will be difficult to fill. Generations that follow his example can learn how to love Bosnia and Herzegovina."

See also
Nijaz Duraković Park

References

External links
Nijaz Duraković at imovinapoliticara.cin.ba

1949 births
2012 deaths
People from Stolac
Bosniaks of Bosnia and Herzegovina
Bosnia and Herzegovina Muslims
Bosniak politicians
League of Communists of Bosnia and Herzegovina politicians
Bosnia and Herzegovina writers
Bosniak writers
Yugoslav writers
20th-century male writers
21st-century male writers
Bosnia and Herzegovina politicians
Social Democratic Party of Bosnia and Herzegovina politicians
Politicians of the Bosnian War
20th-century philosophers
21st-century philosophers
Sarajevo Law School alumni
Army of the Republic of Bosnia and Herzegovina
Members of the Presidency of Bosnia and Herzegovina